The Latin Grammy Award for Best Pop Album by a Duo or Group with Vocals was an honor presented annually at the Latin Grammy Awards between 2001 and 2011.The award was given to duos or groups for albums containing at least 51% of new recordings of the pop genre. In 2000 an award known as Best Pop Performance by a Duo/Group with Vocal was presented. From 2001 to 2011 the award for Best Pop Album by a Duo or Group with Vocals was presented.

Award-winning albums have been recorded by Mexican artists more than any other nationality, though they have also been released by musicians or groups originating from Spain and the United States. Bacilos and Sin Bandera are the most awarded bands in the category with two wins (out of three nominations) each; currently both ensembles are disbanded. Spanish trio Presuntos Implicados hold the record for most nominations without a win, with three, and Mexican band RBD and Spanish bands Amaral, Estopa and Jarabe de Palo had two unsuccessful nominations. The last winner of this category was given to supergroup Alex, Jorge y Lena for their eponymous 2010 album.

Recipients

2000s

2010s

 Each year is linked to the article about the Latin Grammy Awards held that year.

See also

 Grammy Award for Best Pop Performance by a Duo or Group with Vocals
 Latin Grammy Award for Best Female Pop Vocal Album
 Latin Grammy Award for Best Male Pop Vocal Album
 Latin Grammy Award for Best Contemporary Pop Vocal Album
 Latin Grammy Award for Best Traditional Pop Vocal Album

References

General
 

Specific

External links
Official website of the Latin Grammy Awards

 
Duo or Group with Vocal
Awards established in 2000
Awards disestablished in 2011
Pop Album by a Duo or Group with Vocals
Duo or Group with Vocals